DXDR (88.3 FM), broadcasting as 88.3 Energy FM, is a radio station owned and operated by the Ultrasonic Broadcasting System. The station's studio and transmitter are located along Broadcast Ave., Shrine Hills, Matina, Davao City. Established in 1995, it serves as the flagship station of Energy FM.

References

Radio stations in Davao City
Radio stations established in 1995